Securitas Services d.o.o. (Privredno društvo Securitas Services d.o.o) is a Serbian security company specialized in guarding, monitoring, cash handling, analyzing-consulting, security education and in sale of security systems. The company has about 3,900 employees and it is part of the Securitas Sverige AB with headquarters in Belgrade.

References

Companies based in Belgrade
Business services companies established in 2003
D.o.o. companies in Serbia
Security companies of Serbia
Serbian companies established in 2003